Windham William Sadler (1796 – 30  September 1824) was a balloonist born in Ireland.  His father was aviation pioneer James Sadler and, after an education in engineering, Sadler followed in his father's footsteps.  He made an ascent in London during the Grand Jubilee of 1814 and in 1817 made the first successful aerial crossing of the Irish Sea, a feat that had been unsuccessfully attempted by his father.  Sadler was killed when his balloon crashed into a chimney near Blackburn during a flight in 1824.

Early life 
Sadler was born near Dublin in 1796 the son of James Sadler and his second wife.  James Sadler was a pioneer in aviation, being one of the first British balloonists. James Sadler had made his first ascent in 1785 with the politician William Windham who became godfather to Sadler's son, who was named in his honour.

Windham William Sadler received an engineer's education, with a focus on chemistry, and worked for the first town gas company in Liverpool.  He left his employment to focus on aviation.  He made his first flight at the age of 17 and in 1814 flew from Burlington House, London, with Mary Thompson, an actress.  During the Grand Jubilee of 1814 Sadler ascended in a balloon from Green Park, London, to distribute favour and programmes onto the crowd below.

Sadler worked with his father but by now was piloting most of their flights. He flew from the New Barracks in Cork in early September 1816, in a  diameter balloon. He was presented with flags for the trip by Sarah, Countess of Shannon. A flight with Edmond D. Livingston in November from Richmond Barracks, Dublin, intended to be the first to cross the Irish Sea by air. His father had attempted the feat in 1812 but failed, landing in the Irish Sea and being rescued by a fishing vessel.

Irish Sea crossing 
In 1817, Sadler attempted again to cross the Irish Sea by balloon. Sadler's attempt began at 1.30 pm on 22 June 1817 with an ascent from Portobello barracks in Dublin, witnessed by 100,000 spectators. Sadler managed to find the right height to ride the prevailing westerly current towards Great Britain. He recalled seeing, at mid-crossing, the shores of both Wales and Ireland and the entirety of the Isle of Man. Sadler afterwards published an account of his flight, the first successful aerial crossing of the Irish Sea. This account appeared as Balloon: An Authentic Narrative of the Aerial Voyage, of Mr. Sadler Across the Irish Channel and Ærostation: A Narrative of the Aerial Voyage of Mr. Windham Sadler, Across the Irish Channel. A contemporary print by engraver Robert Havell shows Sadler's balloon carrying a banner reading "Erin go bragh" (Irish: Ireland forever).

Later exploits and death 
Sadler married 1819 and afterwards combined his professional aviation exploits with management of a bathing pool in Liverpool. On 28 September 1819 Sadler and companion Mr Armstrong ascended from Kirkby Fair, Liverpool, in his balloon Loyalist watched by 120,000 spectators. In danger of being blown out to the North Sea he pulled a ripcord to release gas from the balloon at Norton, County Durham. His anchor failed but the balloon was eventually brought to a halt. The balloonists had travelled  in less than three hours, in probably the fastest journey then made between Merseyside and Teesside.

In early summer 1824 Sadler made a flight from Oxford. Sadlers's 31st balloon ascent was made on 29 September 1824 at Bolton. In the evening he prepared to land near Blackburn, but his balloon was caught by the wind and struck a chimney. Sadler was thrown out of the basket and sustained fatal injuries, dying at 8.00 am the following morning.  He was buried at Christchurch, Liverpool.

References 

1796 births
1824 deaths
Aviators killed in aviation accidents or incidents in England
Irish balloonists
Irish people of English descent
Aviators from Dublin (city)